Ealing and Hillingdon is a constituency represented in the London Assembly.

It consists of the combined area of the London Borough of Ealing and the London Borough of Hillingdon.

Overlapping constituencies
The constituency contains all of the following UK Parliament constituencies after the 2019 General Election:
Ealing Central and Acton (Labour), Rupa Huq MP
Ealing North (Labour and Co-operative), James Murray MP
Ealing Southall (Labour), Virendra Sharma MP
Hayes and Harlington (Labour), John McDonnell MP
Uxbridge and South Ruislip (Conservative), Boris Johnson MP

Additionally it contains part of one other constituency:
Ruislip, Northwood and Pinner (Conservative), David Simmonds MP

Assembly Members

Mayoral election results 
Below are the results for the candidate which received the highest share of the popular vote in the constituency at each mayoral election.

Assembly election results

References

London Assembly constituencies
Politics of the London Borough of Ealing
Politics of the London Borough of Hillingdon
2000 establishments in England
Constituencies established in 2000